The 1976 All-Pacific-8 Conference football team consists of American football players chosen by various organizations for All-Pacific-8 Conference teams for the 1976 NCAA Division I football season.

Offensive selections

Quarterbacks
 Jack Thompson, Washington State (UPI-1)
 Jeff Dankworth, UCLA (AP-1)

Running backs
 Ricky Bell, USC (AP-1; UPI-1)
 Theotis Brown, UCLA (AP-1; UPI-1)

Wide receivers
 Tony Hill, Stanford (AP-1; UPI-1)
 Mike Levenseller, Washington State (AP-1; UPI-1)

Tight ends
 Rick Walker, UCLA (AP-1; UPI-1)

Offensive linemen
 Marvin Powell, USC (AP-1; UPI-1 [tackle])
 Ted Albrecht, California (AP-1; UPI-1 [tackle])
 Donnie Hickman, USC (AP-1; UPI-1 [guard])
 Alex Karakozoff, USC (AP-1; UPI-1 [guard])

Centers
 Mike Kahn, UCLA (AP-1)
 Duane Williams, California (UPI-1)

Defensive selections

Down linemen
 Gary Jeter, USC (AP-1; UPI-1)
 Duncan McColl, Stanford (AP-1; UPI-1)
 Charles Jackson, Washington (AP-1; UPI-1)
 Manu Tuiasosopo, UCLA (UPI-1)
 Wilson Faumuina, San Jose State (AP-1)
 Kise Fiatoa, Long Beach State (AP-1)

Linebackers
 Dave Lewis, USC (AP-1; UPI-1)
 Rod Martin, USC (AP-1; UPI-1)
 Jerry Robinson, UCLA (AP-1; UPI-1)
 Clay Matthews, Jr., USC (UPI-1)
 Travis Hill, San Diego State (AP-1)

Defensive backs
 Oscar Edwards, UCLA (AP-1; UPI-1)
 Jay Locey, Oregon State (AP-1; UPI-1)
 Dennis Thurman, USC (AP-1; UPI-1)
 Levi Armstrong, UCLA (UPI-1)
 Gerald Small, San Jose State (AP-1)

Special teams

Placekicker
 Jim Breech, California (UPI-1)

Punter
 Frank Corral, UCLA (UPI-1)

Key

AP = Associated Press, not limited to the Pac-8, but covering the west coast

UPI = United Press International

See also
1976 College Football All-America Team

References

All-Pacific-8 Conference Football Team
All-Pac-12 Conference football teams